John Randle (born 1967) is an American football defensive tackle.

John Randle may also refer to:
 John Randle (physician) (1855–1928), West African doctor active in politics in Lagos, now in Nigeria
 John Niel Randle (1917–1944), British recipient of the Victoria Cross